Eupithecia connexa is a moth in the  family Geometridae. It is found in the Democratic Republic of Congo, Ghana, Ivory Coast, Kenya and Uganda.

References

Moths described in 1899
connexa
Insects of Uganda
Moths of Africa